Andrew Parker (May 21, 1805 – January 15, 1864) was a Democratic member of the U.S. House of Representatives from Pennsylvania.

Biography
Andrew Parker was born in Cumberland County, Pennsylvania.  He attended public schools and graduated from Dickinson College in Carlisle, Pennsylvania, in 1824.  He studied law in Carlisle, was admitted to the bar in 1826 and commenced practice in Lewistown, Pennsylvania.  He was appointed deputy attorney general of Mifflin County, Pennsylvania.  He moved to Mifflintown, Pennsylvania, in 1831, where he practiced law.

Parker was elected as a Democrat to the Thirty-second Congress.  He continued the practice of law in Mifflintown until his death there in 1864. He was buried in Westminster Presbyterian Cemetery there.

Sources

Andrew Parker entry at The Political Graveyard

External links

1805 births
1864 deaths
American Presbyterians
Dickinson College alumni
Pennsylvania lawyers
Democratic Party members of the United States House of Representatives from Pennsylvania
People from Cumberland County, Pennsylvania
19th-century American politicians
19th-century American lawyers